Cloud Recordings is an American record label founded in 2001 by John Fernandes and Will Cullen Hart.

List of artists on Cloud Recordings

 Austyn Wohlers
 Black Swan Network
 Circulatory System (band)
 Cult of Riggonia
 Dream Boat
 Faster Circuits
 John Fernandes
 French Exit (band)
 a hawk and a hacksaw
 Icy Demons
 Immaterial Possession
 Jacob Morris
 Lavender Holyfield
 Nesey Gallons
 The New Sound of Numbers 
 Nim (band)
 Old Smokey
 The Olivia Tremor Control
 Supercluster (band)
 Tall Dwarfs
 W. Cullen Hart

External links
 

Record labels established in 2001
Rock record labels